Mohamed Abdel Ghani el-Gamasy (9 September 1921 – 7 June 2003) was an Egyptian Field Marshal (Mushir) and the Commander in Chief of The Armed Forces. He has been called "one of the architects of the 1973 War."

Early life 
El Gamasy was born on 9 September 1921 in Batanoon, Monufia Governorate, Egypt. He was one of two brothers and five sisters. After high school, El Gamassy joined the Egyptian Military Academy and was commissioned in 1941 as a reconnaissance officer in the Cavalry  (1st Cavalry Regiment) As a Major, he was GSO-II of a cavalry battalion during the 1948 War.

October War 
During the War of Attrition, in March 1969, then-President Gamal Abdel Nasser appointed el-Gamasy as commander of the Second Field Army. His appointment was part of a process of rooting out former general commander Abdel Hakim Amer's mostly incompetent loyalists with capable commanders, including Abdul Munim Riad, Saad el-Shazly and Ahmed Ismail. El-Gamasy later wrote that Nasser should have deconstructed Amer's autonomous web of control in the armed forces following the Egyptian military failure during the Suez Crisis in 1956.

El-Gamasy was well known for being the Chief of Operations for all Ground Forces participating in the 1973 October War. He was also appointed by Anwar Sadat as the head of the group that participated in the disengagement talks on 28 October, at "Kilometer 101". Reportedly, he was sad for the lost souls at the war when the American secretary of state Henry Kissinger announced that the president Sadat agreed to pull the main part of the Egyptian forces from the east side of the Suez Canal in exchange of the withdrawal of Israeli forces from the west side of the Suez Canal and retreat back into the depth of Sinai.

Death
On 7 June 2003, El Gamasy died in a hospital in Cairo after a long battle with illness.

Honors
Honor Military Star.
1952 Liberation decoration.
1958 United Republic decoration.

Works
 The October War (Cairo, 1993)

References

External links 
 au.af.mil

1921 births
2003 deaths
Field marshals of Egypt
Defence Ministers of Egypt
Directors of the Military Intelligence and Reconnaissance (Egypt)
Egyptian people of the Yom Kippur War
20th-century Egyptian military personnel
Egyptian Military Academy alumni
People from Monufia Governorate
Chiefs of the General Staff (Egypt)